The Battle of Peleliu, codenamed Operation Stalemate II by the US military, was fought between the United States and Japan during the Mariana and Palau Islands campaign of World War II, from September 15 to November 27, 1944, on the island of Peleliu.

US Marines of the 1st Marine Division and then soldiers of the US Army's 81st Infantry Division, fought to capture an airfield on the small coral island of Peleliu. The battle was part of a larger offensive campaign known as Operation Forager, which ran from June to November 1944 in the Pacific Theater.

Major General William Rupertus, the commander of the 1st Marine Division, predicted that the island would be secured within four days. However, after repeated Imperial Japanese Army defeats in previous island campaigns, Japan had developed new island-defense tactics and well-crafted fortifications, which allowed stiff resistance and extended the battle to more than two months. The heavily-outnumbered Japanese defenders put up such stiff resistance, often by fighting to the death in the Japanese Emperor's name, that the island became known in Japanese as the "Emperor's Island."

In the US, it was a controversial battle because of the island's negligible strategic value and the high casualty rate, which exceeded that of all other amphibious operations during the Pacific War. The National Museum of the Marine Corps called it "the bitterest battle of the war for the Marines".

Background
By 1944, American victories in the Southwest and Central Pacific had brought the war closer to Japan, with American bombers able to strike at the Japanese main islands from air bases secured during the Mariana Islands campaign (June–August 1944). There was disagreement among the U.S. Joint Chiefs over two proposed strategies to defeat the Japanese Empire. The strategy proposed by General Douglas MacArthur called for the recapture of the Philippines, followed by the capture of Okinawa, then an attack on the Japanese home islands. Admiral Chester W. Nimitz favored a more direct strategy of bypassing the Philippines, but seizing Okinawa and Taiwan as staging areas to an attack on the Japanese mainland, followed by the future invasion of Japan's southernmost islands. Both strategies included the invasion of Peleliu, but for different reasons.

The 1st Marine Division had already been chosen to make the assault. U.S. President Franklin D. Roosevelt traveled to Pearl Harbor to personally meet both commanders and hear their arguments. MacArthur's strategy was chosen. However, before MacArthur could retake the Philippines, the Palau Islands, specifically Peleliu and Angaur, were to be neutralized and an airfield built to protect MacArthur's left flank.

Preparations

Japanese

By 1944, Peleliu was occupied by about 11,000 Japanese of the 14th Infantry Division, along with a handful of Korean laborers.  Colonel Kunio Nakagawa, commander of the division's 2nd Regiment, led the preparations for the island's defense.

After their losses in the Solomons, Gilberts, Marshalls, and Marianas, the Imperial Army assembled a research team to develop new island-defense tactics. They chose to abandon the old strategy of trying to stop the enemy on the beaches, where they would be exposed to naval gunfire. The new tactics would only disrupt the landings at the water's edge and depend on an in-depth defense further inland. Colonel Nakagawa used the rough terrain to his advantage, by constructing a system of heavily fortified bunkers, caves, and underground positions, all interlocked in a "honeycomb" system. The traditional "banzai charge" attack was also discontinued as being both wasteful of men and ineffective. These changes would force the Americans into a war of attrition, requiring more resources.

Nakagawa's defenses were centered on Peleliu's highest point, Umurbrogol Mountain, a collection of hills and steep ridges located at the center of Peleliu overlooking a large portion of the island, including the crucial airfield. The Umurbrogol contained some 500 limestone caves, connected by tunnels. Many of these were former mine shafts that were turned into defensive positions. Engineers added sliding armored steel doors with multiple openings to serve both artillery and machine guns. Cave entrances were opened or altered to be slanted as a defense against grenade and flamethrower attacks. The caves and bunkers were connected to a vast tunnel and trench system throughout central Peleliu, which allowed the Japanese to evacuate or reoccupy positions as needed, and to take advantage of shrinking interior lines.

The Japanese also used the beach terrain to their advantage. The northern end of the landing beaches faced a  coral promontory that overlooked the beaches from a small peninsula, a spot later known to the Marines who assaulted it simply as "The Point". Holes were blasted into the ridge to accommodate a  gun, and six 20 mm cannons. The positions were then sealed shut, leaving just a small slit to fire on the beaches. Similar positions were crafted along the  stretch of landing beaches.

The beaches were also filled with thousands of obstacles for the landing craft, principally mines and a large number of heavy artillery shells buried with the fuses exposed to explode when they were run over. A battalion was placed along the beach to defend against the landing, but they were meant to merely delay the inevitable American advance inland.

American
Unlike the Japanese, who drastically altered their tactics for the upcoming battle, the American invasion plan was unchanged from that of previous amphibious landings, even after suffering 3,000 casualties and enduring two months of delaying tactics against the entrenched Japanese defenders at the Battle of Biak. On Peleliu, American planners chose to land on the southwest beaches because of their proximity to the airfield on south Peleliu. The 1st Marine Regiment, commanded by Colonel Lewis B. "Chesty" Puller, was to land on the northern end of the beaches. The 5th Marine Regiment, under Colonel Harold Harris, would land in the center, and the 7th Marine Regiment, under Colonel Herman Hanneken, would land at the southern end.

The division's artillery regiment, the 11th Marines under Colonel William Harrison, would land after the infantry regiments. The plan was for the 1st and 7th Marines to push inland, guarding the 5th Marines' flanks, and allowing them to capture the airfield located directly to the center of the landing beaches. The 5th Marines were to push to the eastern shore, cutting the island in half. The 1st Marines would push north into the Umurbrogol, while the 7th Marines would clear the southern end of the island. Only one battalion was left behind in reserve, with the U.S. Army's 81st Infantry Division available for support from Angaur, just south of Peleliu.

On September 4, the Marines shipped off from their station on Pavuvu, just north of Guadalcanal, a  trip across the Pacific to Peleliu. A Navy Underwater Demolition Team went in first to clear the beaches of obstacles, while warships began their pre-invasion bombardment of Peleliu on September 12.

A total of 519 rounds of  shells, 1,845 rounds of  shells and 1,793  bombs pounded the islands during this period.

The Americans believed the bombardment to be successful, as Rear Admiral Jesse Oldendorf claimed that the Navy had run out of targets. In reality, the majority of Japanese positions were completely unharmed. Even the battalion left to defend the beaches was virtually unscathed. During the assault, the island's defenders exercised unusual firing discipline to avoid giving away their positions. The bombardment managed only to destroy Japan's aircraft on the island, as well as the buildings surrounding the airfield. The Japanese remained in their fortified positions, ready to attack the American landing troops.

Opposing forces

American order of battle
United States Pacific Fleet
Admiral Chester W. Nimitz
US Third Fleet
Admiral William F. Halsey Jr.

Joint Expeditionary Force (Task Force 31)
Vice Admiral Theodore S. Wilkinson

Expeditionary Troops (Task Force 36)
III Amphibious Corps
Major General Julian C. Smith, USMC

Western Landing Force (TG 36.1)
Major General Roy S. Geiger, USMC

1st Marine Division
 Division Commander: Maj. Gen. William H. Rupertus, USMC
 Asst. Division Commander: Brig. Gen. Oliver P. Smith, USMC
 Chief of Staff: Col. John T. Selden, USMC
Beach assignments
 Left (White 1 & 2)
 1st Marine Regiment (Col. Lewis B. "Chesty" Puller, USMC)
 Co. A of the following: 1st Engineer Battalion, 1st Pioneer Battalion, 1st Medical Battalion, 1st Tank Battalion
 Center (Orange 1 & 2)
 5th Marine Regiment (Col. Harold D. "Bucky" Harris, USMC)
 Co. B of the following: 1st Engineer Battalion, 1st Pioneer Battalion, 1st Medical Battalion, 1st Tank Battalion (reduced)
 Right (Orange 3)
 7th Marine Regiment (Col. Herman H. "Hard-Headed" Hanneken, USMC)
 Co. C of the following: 1st Engineer Battalion, 1st Pioneer Battalion, 1st Medical Battalion, 1st Tank Battalion (reduced)
 Other units
 11th Marine Regiment, Artillery (Col. William H. Harrison, USMC)
 12th Antiaircraft Artillery Battalion
 1st Amphibian Tractor Battalion
 3rd Armored Amphibian Tractor Battalion
 4th, 5th, 6th Marine War Dog Platoons
 UDT 6 and UDT 7

Japanese order of battle

Palau District Group
Lieutenant General Inoue Sadao (HQ on Koror Island)
Vice Admiral Yoshioka Ito
Maj. Gen. Kenjiro Murai

14th Division (Lt. Gen. Sadao)
Peleliu Sector Unit (Lt. Col. Kunio Nakagawa)
 2nd Infantry Regiment, Reinforced
 2nd Bttn. / 2nd Infantry Regiment
 3rd Bttn. / 2nd Infantry Regiment
 3rd Bttn. / 15th Infantry Regiment
 346th Bttn. / 53rd Independent Mixed Brigade

Battle

Landing

U.S. Marines landed on Peleliu at 08:32, on September 15, the 1st Marines to the north on White Beach 1 and 2 and the 5th and 7th Marines to the center and south on Orange Beach 1, 2, and 3. As the other landing craft approached the beaches, the Marines were caught in a crossfire when the Japanese opened the steel doors guarding their positions and fired artillery. The positions on the coral promontories guarding each flank fired on the Marines with 47 mm guns and 20 mm cannons. By 09:30, the Japanese had destroyed 60 LVTs and DUKWs.

Puller's LVT was hit by a dud high velocity artillery round, and his communications section was destroyed on its way to the beach by a hit from a 47 mm round. The 7th Marines faced a cluttered Orange Beach 3, with natural and man-made obstacles, forcing the LVTs to approach in column.

The 5th Marines made the most progress on the first day, aided by cover provided by coconut groves. They pushed toward the airfield, but were met with Nakagawa's first counterattack. His armored tank company raced across the airfield to push the Marines back, but was soon engaged by tanks, howitzers, naval guns, and dive bombers. Nakagawa's tanks and escorting infantrymen were quickly destroyed.

At the end of the first day, the Americans held their  stretch of landing beaches, but little else. The Marines had suffered 200 dead and 900 wounded. Rupertus, still unaware of his enemy's change of tactics, believed the Japanese would quickly crumble since their perimeter had been broken.

Airfield/South Peleliu

On the second day, the 5th Marines moved to capture the airfield and push toward the eastern shore. They ran across the airfield, enduring heavy artillery fire from the highlands to the north, suffering heavy casualties in the process. After capturing the airfield, they rapidly advanced to the eastern end of Peleliu, leaving the island's southern defenders to be destroyed by the 7th Marines.

This area was hotly contested by the Japanese, who still occupied numerous pillboxes. Further complicating the situation, the Marines' water was distributed in empty oil drums, contaminating the water with the oil residue. Still, by the eighth day the 5th and 7th Marines had accomplished their objectives, holding the airfield and the southern portion of the island, although the airfield remained under threat of sustained Japanese fire from the heights of Umurbrogol Mountain until the end of the battle.

American forces began using the airfield on the third day of the campaign. L-2 Grasshoppers from VMO-3 began aerial spotting missions for Marine artillery and naval gunfire support. On September 26 (D+11), Marine F4U Corsairs from VMF-114 landed on the airstrip. The Corsairs began dive-bombing missions across Peleliu, firing rockets into open cave entrances for the infantrymen, and dropping napalm; it was only the second time the latter weapon had been used in the Pacific. Napalm proved effective, burning away the vegetation hiding spider holes and usually killing their occupants.

The time from takeoff to the target area for the Corsairs operating from Peleliu Airfield was very short, sometimes only 10 to 15 seconds. Most pilots did not bother to raise the aircraft's landing gear, leaving them down during the air strike. After the strike was completed, the Corsair simply turned back into the landing pattern again.

The Point

"The Point" at the end of the southern landing beaches continued to cause heavy Marine casualties due to enfilading fire from Japanese heavy machine guns and anti-tank artillery across the landing beaches. Puller ordered Captain George P. Hunt, commander of K Company, 3rd Battalion 1st Marines, to capture the position. Hunt's company approached "The Point" short on supplies, having lost most of its machine guns while approaching the beaches. Hunt's second platoon was pinned down for nearly a day in an anti-tank trench between fortifications. The rest of his company was endangered when the Japanese cut a hole in their line, surrounding his company and leaving his right flank cut off.

However, a rifle platoon began knocking out the Japanese gun positions one by one. Using smoke grenades for concealment, the platoon swept through each hole, destroying the positions with rifle grenades and close-quarters combat. After knocking out the six machine gun positions, the Marines faced the 47 mm gun cave. A lieutenant blinded the 47 mm gunner's visibility with a smoke grenade, allowing Corporal Henry W. Hahn to launch a grenade through the cave's aperture. The grenade detonated the 47 mm's shells, forcing the cave's occupants out with their bodies alight and their ammunition belts exploding around their waists. A Marine fire team was positioned on the flank of the cave where the emerging occupants were shot down.

K Company had captured "The Point", but Nakagawa counterattacked. The next 30 hours saw four major counterattacks against a sole company, critically low on supplies, out of water and surrounded. The Marines soon had to resort to hand-to-hand combat to fend off the Japanese attackers. By the time reinforcements arrived, the company had successfully repulsed all of the Japanese attacks, but had been reduced to 18 men, suffering 157 casualties during the battle for The Point. Hunt and Hahn were both awarded the Navy Cross for their actions.

Ngesebus Island

The 5th Marines—after having secured the airfield—were sent to capture Ngesebus Island, just north of Peleliu. Ngesebus was occupied by many Japanese artillery positions and was the site of an airfield still under construction. The tiny island was connected to Peleliu by a small causeway, but 5th Marines commander Harris opted instead to make a shore-to-shore amphibious landing, predicting the causeway to be an obvious target for the island's defenders.

Harris coordinated a pre-landing bombardment of the island on September 28, carried out by Army  guns, naval guns, howitzers from the 11th Marines, strafing runs from VMF-114's Corsairs and  fire from the approaching LVTs. Unlike the Navy's bombardment of Peleliu, Harris' assault on Ngesebus successfully killed most of the Japanese defenders. The Marines still faced opposition in the ridges and caves, but the island fell quickly, with relatively light casualties for the 5th Marines. They had suffered 15 killed and 33 wounded and inflicted 470 casualties on the Japanese.

Bloody Nose Ridge

After capturing "The Point", the 1st Marines moved north into the Umurbrogol pocket, named "Bloody Nose Ridge" by the Marines. Puller led his men in numerous assaults, but each resulted in severe casualties from Japanese fire. The 1st Marines were trapped in the narrow paths between the ridges, with each ridge fortification supporting the other with deadly crossfire.

The Marines took increasingly high casualties as they slowly advanced through the ridges. The Japanese again showed unusual fire discipline, striking only when they could inflict maximum casualties. As casualties mounted, Japanese snipers began to take aim at stretcher bearers, knowing that if stretcher bearers were injured or killed, more would have to return to replace them and the snipers could steadily pick off more and more Marines. The Japanese also infiltrated the American lines at night to attack the Marines in their fighting holes. The Marines built two-man fighting holes, so one Marine could sleep while the other kept watch for infiltrators.

One particularly bloody battle on Bloody Nose came when the 1st Battalion, 1st Marines—under the command of Major Raymond Davis—attacked Hill 100. Over six days of fighting, the battalion suffered 71% casualties. Captain Everett P. Pope and his company penetrated deep into the ridges, leading his remaining 90 men to seize what he thought was Hill 100. It took a day's fighting to reach what he thought was the crest of the hill, which was in fact another ridge occupied by more Japanese defenders. 
Trapped at the base of the ridge, Pope set up a small defensive perimeter, which was attacked relentlessly by the Japanese throughout the night. The Marines soon ran out of ammunition and had to fight the attackers with knives and fists, even resorting to throwing coral rock and empty ammunition boxes at the Japanese. Pope and his men managed to hold out until dawn came, which brought on more deadly fire. When they evacuated the position, only nine men remained. Pope later received the Medal of Honor for the action. (Picture of the Peleliu Memorial dedicated on the 50th anniversary of the landing on Peleliu with Captain Pope's name)

The Japanese eventually inflicted 70% casualties on Puller's 1st Marines, or 1,749 men. After six days of fighting in the ridges of Umurbrogol, Geiger sent elements of the U.S. Army's 81st Infantry Division to Peleliu to relieve the regiment. The 321st Regiment Combat Team landed on the western beaches of Peleliu—at the northern end of Umurbrogol mountain—on September 23. The 321st and the 7th Marines encircled "The Pocket" by September 24, D+9.

By October 15, the 7th Marines had suffered 46% casualties and Geiger relieved them with the 5th Marines. Col. Harris adopted siege tactics, using bulldozers and flame-thrower tanks, pushing from the north. On October 30, the 81st Infantry Division took over command of Peleliu, taking another six weeks, with the same tactics, to reduce "The Pocket".

On November 24, Nakagawa proclaimed "Our sword is broken and we have run out of spears". He then burnt his regimental colors and performed ritual suicide. He was posthumously promoted to lieutenant general for his valor displayed on Peleliu. On November 27, the island was declared secure, ending the 73-day-long battle.

A Japanese lieutenant with twenty-six 2nd Infantry soldiers and eight 45th Guard Force sailors held out in the caves in Peleliu until April 22, 1947, and surrendered after a Japanese admiral convinced them the war was over.

Aftermath

The reduction of the Japanese pocket around Umurbrogol mountain has been called the most difficult fight that the U.S. military encountered in the entire war. The 1st Marine Division was mauled and remained out of action until the invasion of Okinawa began on April 1, 1945. In total, the 1st Marine Division suffered over 6,500 casualties during its month on Peleliu, over one third of the entire division. The 81st Infantry Division also suffered heavy losses with 3,300 casualties during its tenure on the island.

Postwar statisticians calculated that it took U.S. forces over 1500 rounds of ammunition to kill each Japanese defender and that, during the course of the battle, the Americans expended 13.32 million rounds of .30-calibre, 1.52 million rounds of .45-calibre, 693,657 rounds of .50-calibre bullets, 118,262 hand grenades, and approximately 150,000 mortar rounds.

The battle was controversial in the United States due to the island's lack of strategic value and the high casualty rate. The defenders lacked the means to interfere with potential US operations in the Philippines and the airfield captured on Peleliu did not play a key role in subsequent operations. Instead, the Ulithi Atoll in the Caroline Islands was used as a staging base for the invasion of Okinawa. The high casualty rate exceeded all other amphibious operations during the Pacific War.

In addition, few news reports were published about the battle because Rupertus' prediction of a "three days" victory motivated only six reporters to report from shore. The battle was also overshadowed by MacArthur's return to the Philippines and the Allies' push towards Germany in Europe.

The battles for Angaur and Peleliu showed Americans the pattern of future Japanese island defense but they made few adjustments for the battles for Iwo Jima and Okinawa. Naval bombardment prior to amphibious assault at Iwo Jima was only slightly more effective than at Peleliu, but at Okinawa the preliminary shelling was much improved. Frogmen performing underwater demolition at Iwo Jima confused the enemy by sweeping both coasts, but later alerted Japanese defenders to the exact assault beaches at Okinawa. American ground forces at Peleliu gained experience in assaulting heavily fortified positions such as they would find again at Okinawa.

On the recommendation of Admiral William F. Halsey Jr., the planned occupation of Yap Island in the Caroline Islands was canceled. Halsey actually recommended that the landings on Peleliu and Angaur be canceled, too, and their Marines and soldiers be thrown into Leyte Island instead, but was overruled by Nimitz.

In popular culture

In the March of Time's 1951 documentary TV series, Crusade in the Pacific, Episode 17 is "The Fight for Bloody Nose Ridge."

In NBC-TV's 1952–53 documentary TV series Victory at Sea, Episode 18, "Two if by Sea" covers the assaults at Peleliu and Angaur.

The battle including footage and stills are featured in the fifth episode of Ken Burns's The War.

The battle features in episodes 5, 6 and 7 of the TV mini-series The Pacific.

In his book With the Old Breed, Eugene Sledge described his experiences in the Battle for Peleliu.

In 2015, the Japanese magazine Young Animal commenced the serialization of Peleliu: Rakuen no Guernica by Masao Hiratsuka and the artist Kazuyoshi Takeda. It tells the story of the battle in manga form.

One of the final scenes in Parer's War, a 2014 Australian television film, shows the Battle of Peleliu recorded by Damien Parer with his camera at the time of his death.

The Peleliu Campaign features as one of the campaigns in the 2019 solitaire tactical wargame “Fields of Fire” Volume 2, designed by Ben Hull, published by GMT Games LLC.

The Battle of Peleliu is featured in many video games with a World War II theme, including Call of Duty: World at War. The player takes the role of a US Marine tasked with taking Peleliu Airfield, repelling counter-attacks, destroying machine-gun and mortar positions, and eventually securing Japanese artillery emplacements at the point. In flight-simulation game War Thunder, two teams of players clash to hold the southern and northern airfields. In multi-player shooter Red Orchestra 2: Rising Storm, a team of American troops attack the defensive Japanese team's control points.

Individual honors

Japan

Posthumous promotions
For heroism:
 Colonel Kunio Nakagawa – lieutenant general
 Kenjiro Murai – lieutenant general

United States

Medal of Honor recipients
 Captain Everett P. Pope – 1st Battalion, 1st Marines
 First Lieutenant Carlton R. Rouh – 1st Battalion, 5th Marines
 Corporal Lewis K. Bausell –1st Battalion, 5th Marines (Posthumous)
 Private First Class Arthur J. Jackson – 3rd Battalion, 7th Marines
 Private First Class Richard E. Kraus – 8th Amphibian Tractor Battalion, 1st Marine Division (Reinforced) (Posthumous)
 Private First Class John D. New – 2nd Battalion, 7th Marines (Posthumous)
 Private First Class Wesley Phelps – 3rd Battalion, 7th Marines (Posthumous)
 Private First Class Charles H. Roan – 2nd Battalion, 7th Marines (Posthumous)

Unit citations

 Presidential Unit Citation:
 1st Marine Division, September 15 to 29, 1944
 1st Amphibian Tractor Battalion, FMF
 U. S. Navy Flame Thrower Unit Attached
 6th Amphibian Tractor Battalion (Provisional), FMF
 3d Armored Amphibian Battalion (Provisional), FMF
 Detachment Eighth Amphibian Tractor Battalion, FMF
 454th Amphibian Truck Company, U. S. Army
 456th Amphibian Truck Company, U. S. Army
 4th Joint Assault Signal Company, FMF
 5th Separate Wire Platoon, FMF
 6th Separate Wire Platoon, FMF
 Detachment 33rd Naval Construction Battalion (202 Personnel)
 Detachment 73rd Naval Construction Battalion's Shore Party (241 Personnel)
 USMC Commendatory Letter:
 11th Marine Depot Company (segregated)
 7th Marine Ammunition Company (segregated)
 17th Special Naval Construction Battalion (segregated)

See also
 U.S. National Register of Historic Places (The Peleliu Battlefield, listed 1985)
 , an amphibious assault ship named in memory of the battle
 Helmet for My Pillow, a memoir of the battle written by Robert Leckie
Peleliu Naval Base
Naval Base Kossol Roads

Notes

References

Bibliography
 
 
 Blair, Bobby C., and John Peter DeCioccio. Victory at Peleliu: The 81st Infantry Division's Pacific Campaign (University of Oklahoma Press; 2011) 310 pages

Further reading

External links

 
 
 
 
 
 
 
 
 

Peleliu
Palau in World War II
Battles of World War II involving Japan
Battles of World War II involving the United States
History of Palau
Wars involving Palau
Pacific Ocean theatre of World War II
South Seas Mandate in World War II
Amphibious operations of World War II
World War II operations and battles of the Pacific theatre
United States Marine Corps in World War II
September 1944 events
October 1944 events
November 1944 events
Seabees